Jake Silas (born September 1, 1991) is a Canadian football offensive lineman who is currently a free agent. He previously played for the Ottawa Redblacks of the Canadian Football League (CFL). He played college football at the University at Buffalo and attended Portland High School in Portland, Michigan. Silas signed with Ottawa as a free agent following the end of his college football career. After spending the entire 2015 season on the Redblacks' practice squad, he was signed to the active roster for the 2016 season, and made his CFL debut in the starting lineup on June 25, 2016, against the Edmonton Eskimos.

References

External links
CFL profile
Ottawa Redblacks bio
Buffalo Bulls bio

Living people
1991 births
American football offensive linemen
Canadian football offensive linemen
American players of Canadian football
Buffalo Bulls football players
Ottawa Redblacks players
Players of American football from Michigan
People from Portland, Michigan